The 2015–16 ASEAN Basketball League season was the sixth season of competition of the ASEAN Basketball League (ABL). The regular season started on 27 October 2015 and ended on 21 February 2016. Two Indonesian teams, the Indonesia Warriors and Laskar Dreya South Sumatra did not return to the league.

The Westports Malaysia Dragons defeated first-time finalist Singapore Slingers in the finals, earning the Dragons its first ever championship in franchise history since joining the league in 2009.

Teams

Imports
The following is the list of imports, which had played for their respective teams at least once. In the left are the World Imports, and in the right are the ASEAN/Heritage Imports. Flags indicate the citizenship/s the player holds.

Standings

Results
Score of the home team is listed first.
In case where a game went into overtime, the number of asterisks denotes the number of overtime periods played.

First and second round

Third and fourth round

Playoffs

Semifinals

Malaysia vs. Saigon

Singapore vs. Bangkok City

Finals

Awards
The awarding ceremony was held before the Game 2 of the ABL Finals on March 13, 2016 held at the MABA Stadium, Kuala Lumpur, Malaysia.

 ASEAN Heritage MVP: Matthew Wright (Westports Malaysia Dragons)
 World Import MVP: Reggie Johnson (Westports Malaysia Dragons)
 Local MVP: Wong Wei Long (Singapore Slingers)
 Defensive Player of the Year: Christien Charles (Hi-Tech Bangkok City)
 Coach of the Year: Neo Beng Siang (Singapore Slingers)

Players of the week

References

External links
 Official website

 
ABL
2015-16
2015–16 in Philippine basketball
2015–16 in Malaysian basketball
2015–16 in Indonesian basketball
2015–16 in Singaporean basketball
2015–16 in Thai basketball
2015–16 in Vietnamese basketball